is the 7th major single by the Japanese girl idol group S/mileage. It was released in Japan on September 28, 2011 on the label Hachama.

The physical CD single debuted at number 3 in the Oricon daily singles chart.

In the Oricon weekly chart, it debuted at number 4.

B-sides 
The B-side of the Limited Edition C is a cover of the song "Boogie Train '03" by Miki Fujimoto. She released it as a single in 2003.

Release 
The single was released in five versions: four limited editions (Limited Editions A, B, C, and  D) and a regular edition.

All the limited editions came with a sealed-in serial-numbered entry card for the lottery to win a ticket to one of the single's launch events.

The corresponding DVD single (so called Single V) was released 2 weeks later, on October 12, 2011.

Personnel 
S/mileage members: 
 Ayaka Wada
 Yūka Maeda
 Kanon Fukuda
 Kana Nakanishi
 Fuyuka Kosuga
 Akari Takeuchi
 Rina Katsuta
 Meimi Tamura

Track listing

Regular Edition, Limited Editions A, B

Limited Edition C

Limited Edition D

Charts

References

External links 
 Profile of the CD single on the official website of Hello! Project
 Profile of the Single V on the official website of Hello! Project
 Profile of the Event V on the official website of Hello! Project

2011 singles
Japanese-language songs
Angerme songs
Songs written by Tsunku
Song recordings produced by Tsunku
2011 songs